Mohone is the name of a little town which falls under the Thane district of Maharashtra. It belongs to the Kalyan-Dombivli Municipal Corporation.

External links
Kalyan Dombivli Municipal Corporation

Cities and towns in Thane district
Kalyan-Dombivli